South San Jose is the southern region of San Jose, California. The name "South Side" refers to an area bounded roughly by Hillsdale Avenue and Capitol Expressway to the North, Camden Avenue to the West, Highway 101 and Hellyer Avenue on the east, the border with the city of Morgan Hill towards the south, and Los Gatos, to the west.

The area is expansive with a mix of businesses, green space, and parks. Two business districts, urban villages and a highly educated workforce make the neighborhood attractive to workers and companies.

Neighborhoods 

Neighborhoods in South San Jose include:
Almaden Valley
Calero
New Almaden
Blossom Valley
Edenvale
Santa Teresa
Seven Trees

Light rail stations
Capitol (VTA)
Branham (VTA)
Ohlone-Chynoweth (VTA)
Almaden (VTA)
Blossom Hill (VTA)
Snell (VTA)
Cottle (VTA)
Santa Teresa (VTA)

Parks and trails
Coyote Creek Trail
Guadalupe River Trail
Almaden Quicksilver County Park
Santa Teresa County Park
Martial Cottle Park

Major highways

See also 
Oakridge Mall

References

Geography of San Jose, California
Neighborhoods in San Jose, California